Moskon was a Getic king who ruled in the 3rd century BC the northern parts of Dobruja, probably being the head of a local tribal union, which had close relations with the local Greek colonies and adopted the Greek style of administration.

His existence is proven by silver coins found near Tulcea, all of them featuring the head of a young man with long hair and a tiara and a horseman on the reverse, with the writing ΒΑΣΙΛΕΩΣ ΜΟΣΚΩΝΟΣ, Basileos Moskonos, i.e. King Moskon.

References
C. Preda, SCIV XV (1964), 401–410; idem, Fasti Archeologici XVII (1965), p. 237 nr.3353
Radu Ocheşeanu,  Monedele basileului Moskon aflate în colecţiile Muzeului de arheologie Constanţa (=Coins of Basileus Moskon in the collections of the Archaeological Museum at Constantza), în Pontica 3 (1970), p. 125-128.
Dicţionar de istorie veche a României ("Dictionary of ancient Romanian history") (1976) Editura Ştiinţifică şi Enciclopedică, pp. 416

History of Dobruja
Dacian kings
3rd-century BC rulers